Graham George Wilkins (born 28 June 1955 in Hillingdon) is an English retired professional football full back who made over 130 appearances in the Football League for Chelsea. He also played league football for Brentford and Southend United.

Career 
Able to play on either flank as a full back, Wilkins began his career at Chelsea at the age of 10 and signed his first professional contract in 1972. He remained a bit-part player until the 1976–77 season, when he made 29 appearances to help the Blues to promotion back to the First Division. Wilkins remained at Stamford Bridge until July 1982, by which time he had made 151 appearances and scored one goal. He dropped down to the Third Division to join West London neighbours Brentford on a free transfer, but with the Bees he experienced "the worst two years of my life. I dislocated my shoulder, had seven teeth kicked out, ruptured my cruciate ligaments and that was it". Wilkins' final appearances as a professional came late in the 1983–84 season, on loan at Third Division club Southend United.

Personal life 
Wilkins was the son of footballer George Wilkins and the eldest of four Hillingdon-born brothers who played professional football. He later worked at Heathrow Airport.

Honours 
Chelsea
 Football League Second Division second-place promotion: 1976–77

Career statistics

References

External links
 Graham Wilkins at Sporting Heroes

1955 births
Living people
Footballers from Hillingdon
English footballers
Association football fullbacks
Chelsea F.C. players
Brentford F.C. players
Southend United F.C. players
English Football League players
Graham